Reuben Ngata (born 31 October 1936) is a former New Zealand Paralympic athlete of Ngāti Porou descent. In 1961, he became diagnosed with Polio. In the 1968 Summer Paralympics he competed in athletics. In the 1976 Summer Paralympics he competed in athletics, table tennis and weightlifting, winning a bronze medal in the Weightlifting in men's lightweight.

He would later take up boccia after the Toronto Games.

References

External links
 
 

Athletes (track and field) at the 1968 Summer Paralympics
Athletes (track and field) at the 1976 Summer Paralympics
Table tennis players at the 1976 Summer Paralympics
Weightlifters at the 1976 Summer Paralympics
Paralympic bronze medalists for New Zealand
Living people
1936 births
Sportspeople from the Gisborne District
Ngāti Porou people
Medalists at the 1976 Summer Paralympics
Paralympic medalists in weightlifting
Paralympic weightlifters of New Zealand